I Was a Student at Heidelberg (German: Ich war zu Heidelberg Student) is as a 1927 German silent film directed by Wolfgang Neff and starring Mary Kid and Eva Speyer.

The film's art direction was by Gustav A. Knauer.

Cast
In alphabetical order
 Franz Baumann 
 Friedrich Benfer 
 Wilhelm Diegelmann 
 Hugo Döblin 
 Werner Fuetterer 
 Robert Garrison 
 Fritz Greiner 
 Charles Willy Kayser 
 Alice Kempen 
 Mary Kid 
 Hermann Picha 
 Eva Speyer 
 Eduard von Winterstein 
 Lotte Werkmeister

References

Bibliography
 Douglas B. Thomas. The early history of German motion pictures, 1895-1935. Thomas International, 1999.

External links

1927 films
Films of the Weimar Republic
Films directed by Wolfgang Neff
German silent feature films
Films set in Heidelberg
German black-and-white films